Primo de Rivera is a Spanish family prominent in politics of the 19th and 20th centuries:

Fernando Primo de Rivera (1831–1921), Spanish politician and soldier
Miguel Primo de Rivera (1870–1930), nephew of Fernando, military officer and dictator in Spain from  1923 to 1930
José Antonio Primo de Rivera (1903–1936), son of Miguel, lawyer who founded the Falange Española
Pilar Primo de Rivera (1907–1991), daughter of Miguel, founded the women's section of the Falange

de:Primo de Rivera